Gratiot County is a county in the U.S. state of Michigan. As of the 2020 Census, the population was 41,761. The county seat is Ithaca, although its most populous city is Alma.

Gratiot County comprises the Alma, MI Micropolitan Statistical Area, which is also part of the Mount Pleasant-Alma, MI Combined Statistical Area. The Gratiot County Courthouse was designed in the classical revival style by Claire Allen, a prominent southern Michigan architect. It is one of seven sites in the county listed on the National Register of Historic Places (No. 76002291 added 1976). In June 2012, the 212.8 MW Gratiot County Wind Project opened, the largest wind power installation in the state.

History
Gratiot County, Michigan is named for Captain Charles Gratiot, who supervised the building of Port Huron's Fort Gratiot.   It was described by the Territorial Legislature in 1831. By 1837, the Territory had been admitted to the Union as a state; in 1855 the State Legislature authorized the organization of Gratiot County – the death year of the county's namesake.

Gratiot County was a New England settlement. The original founders of Ithaca and of Alma were settlers from New England, "Yankees", descended from the English Puritans who settled the northeastern coast of the new continent in the 1600s.  The Gratiot County settlers were farmers who headed west into what was then the wilds of the Northwest Territory during the early 1800s. Most of them arrived as a result of the completion of the Erie Canal as well as the close of the Black Hawk War. They arrived to virgin forest and wild prairie, but laid out farms, constructed roads, erected government buildings and established post routes. They maintained their customs, such as passion for education, and abhorrence of the existing slave trade. They were members of the Congregationalist Church or the Episcopal Church.

In the 1890s, German immigrants began settling in Gratiot County. See List of Michigan county name etymologies. Emil Lockwood, a noted Michigan legislator, represented Gratiot County in the Michigan Senate from 1963 to 1970, much of the time as Senate Majority Leader.

There are six Michigan historical markers in Gratiot County:
 Alma College
 Gratiot County
 Jackson Weller House
 Lumberjack Park
 Michigan Masonic Home
 Saginaw and Gratiot County State Road / Saginaw Valley & St. Louis Railroad

Geography
It is considered to be part of Central Michigan.

Adjacent counties
 Midland County – northeast
 Isabella County – northwest
 Saginaw County – east
 Montcalm County – west
 Shiawassee County – southeast
 Clinton County – south
 Ionia County – southwest

Major highways
  – runs north to I-75 and south to Lansing.
  – business loop through downtown Alma.
  – business loop through downtown Ithaca.
  – business loop through downtown St. Louis.
  – cross-peninsular highway that runs east to Saginaw and Port Sanilac; runs west to Muskegon.
  – runs east to Flint; runs west to US 131 near Grand Rapids.

Demographics

As of the 2000 United States Census, there were 42,285 people, 14,501 households, and 10,397 families residing in the county. The population density was 74 people per square mile (29/km2). There were 15,516 housing units at an average density of 27 per square mile (11/km2). The racial makeup of the county was 92.01% White, 3.72% Black or African American, 0.55% Native American, 0.34% Asian, 0.02% Pacific Islander, 1.76% from other races, and 1.60% from two or more races. 4.43% of the population were Hispanic or Latino of any race. 29.8% were of English ancestry, 24.4% were of German ancestry and 6.9% Irish ancestry, 96.1% spoke English and 2.7% Spanish as their first language.

There were 14,501 households, out of which 34.00% had children under the age of 18 living with them, 57.60% were married couples living together, 10.20% had a female householder with no husband present, and 28.30% were non-families. 23.70% of all households were made up of individuals, and 10.70% had someone living alone who was 65 years of age or older. The average household size was 2.57 and the average family size was 3.02.

The county population included 23.80% under the age of 18, 11.60% from 18 to 24, 29.50% from 25 to 44, 21.60% from 45 to 64, and 13.50% who were 65 years of age or older. The median age was 36 years. For every 100 females there were 108.30 males. For every 100 females age 18 and over, there were 109.10 males.

The median income for a household in the county was $37,262, and the median income for a family was $43,954. Males had a median income of $32,442 versus $22,333 for females. The per capita income for the county was $17,118. About 7.30% of families and 10.30% of the population were below the poverty line, including 11.70% of those under age 18 and 9.20% of those age 65 or over.

Religion
The Roman Catholic Diocese of Saginaw is the controlling regional body for the Catholic Church.

Government
Gratiot County has been reliably Republican from the beginning. Since 1884, the Republican Party nominee has carried the county vote in 76% of the elections (26 of 34 elections).

The county government operates the jail, maintains rural roads, operates the major local courts, records deeds, mortgages, and vital records, administers public health regulations, and participates with the state in the provision of other social services. The county board of commissioners controls the budget, and has limited authority to make laws or ordinances. In Michigan, most local
government functions — police and fire, building and zoning, tax assessment, street maintenance, etc. — are the responsibility of individual cities and townships.

Elected officials
 Prosecuting Attorney: Keith J. Kushion
 Sheriff: Mike Morris
 County Clerk: Angie Thompson
 County Treasurer: Michelle Thomas
 Register of Deeds: Mary Merchant
 Drain Commissioner: Bernard J. Barnes

Communities

Cities
 Alma
 Ithaca (county seat)
 St. Louis

Villages
 Ashley
 Breckenridge
 Perrinton

Unincorporated communities

 Bannister
 Beebe
 Edgewood
 Elm Hall
 Elwell
 Forest Hill
 Galloway
 Middleton
 Newark
 New Haven Center
 North Star
 Pompeii
 Rathbone
 Riverdale
 Sethton
 Sickles
 Sumner
 Wheeler

Ghost towns
 Bridgeville
 Langport
 Ola

Townships

 Arcada Township
 Bethany Township
 Elba Township
 Emerson Township
 Fulton Township
 Hamilton Township
 Lafayette Township
 New Haven Township
 Newark Township
 North Shade Township
 North Star Township
 Pine River Township
 Seville Township
 Sumner Township
 Washington Township
 Wheeler Township

See also
 List of Michigan State Historic Sites in Gratiot County, Michigan
 National Register of Historic Places listings in Gratiot County, Michigan

References

External links
 Gratiot County Government
 Gratiot County Area Chamber of Commerce
 Greater Gratiot Development
 Gratiot County Community Connection
 Gratiot County Community Foundation
 

 
Michigan counties
Superfund sites in Michigan
1855 establishments in Michigan
Populated places established in 1855